Offerton is a suburb of Stockport, Greater Manchester, England. Historically in Cheshire, it includes Bosden Farm, Foggbrook and the Offerton Estate. Offerton School closed in 2012 and is now home to Castle Hill High School. The ward population at the UK Census 2011 was 13,720.

History
In 1875 Offerton was one of eight civil parishes in Cheshire to be included in the Stockport Rural Sanitary District. The sanitary district became the Stockport Rural District in 1894. It became part of the Hazel Grove and Bramhall urban district in 1900. The district was abolished in 1974, under the Local Government Act 1972, and its former area was transferred to Greater Manchester to be combined with that of other districts to form the Metropolitan Borough of Stockport.

References

Areas of Stockport